Jim Gault (born 24 April 1954) is a wheelchair curler who competed for Great Britain at the 2014 Winter Paralympics after being called up as a replacement for Tom Killin who pulled out due to illness. This will be his Paralympic debut.

He won a bronze medal at the 2014 Winter Paralympics at Sochi with the British team beating China 7–3 in the third-place play-off match.

References

External links 
 

1954 births
Living people
Scottish male curlers
Scottish wheelchair curlers
Paralympic wheelchair curlers of Great Britain
Paralympic medalists in wheelchair curling
Paralympic bronze medalists for Great Britain
Wheelchair curlers at the 2014 Winter Paralympics
Medalists at the 2014 Winter Paralympics